Des Hansen (20 May 1912 – 25 December 2007) was an Australian cricketer. He played in 30 first-class matches for Queensland between 1931 and 1940.

See also
 List of Queensland first-class cricketers

References

External links
 

1912 births
2007 deaths
Australian cricketers
Queensland cricketers
Cricketers from Brisbane